Charles Brandon Creighton (born August 5, 1970) is an American attorney and politician from Conroe, Texas, who is a Republican member of the Texas Senate from District 4, and a former member of the Texas House of Representatives from District 16.

Background

Brandon Creighton was born in Conroe, Texas to Patricia (née Kincannon) and Morris Creighton.  He is the youngest of their three children. He is a long-term member of the First Baptist Church of Conroe. He is an eighth-generation Montgomery County resident, where he resides with his family. Creighton graduated from Conroe High School, and holds a Bachelor of Arts degree from the University of Texas at Austin and a Juris Doctor from Oklahoma City University School of Law in Oklahoma City, Oklahoma.

While he was a student at the University of Texas, Creighton worked as a Senate Messenger, and is the first to ever go on to serve as a State Senator.  He also served as a policy advisor in the Texas Senate.

Creighton is vice president and general counsel of the Signorelli Company, a home and office building development firm in Conroe. He is also a rancher.

Political career

Creighton's first campaign was for the Texas House District 16 in 2002 (based entirely in suburban Montgomery County, near Houston in the southeastern portion of the state). He lost to the incumbent, attorney Ruben W. Hope, Jr., 6,126 (55.6 percent) to 4,884 (44.4 percent). In 2006, Hope decided to retire and not seek re-election.

In 2006 after Hope's decision to retire, Creighton joined two intraparty rivals, Dale Inman and Vicky Rudy, in the Republican primary.  Creighton won the Republican nomination for House District 16 with 56.6 percent of the vote. In the 2006 general election, Creighton defeated the Democrat Pat Poland, 23,945 (75 percent) to 7,963 (25 percent). Since first winning the seat in 2006, Creighton has faced no further primary or general election opponents.

While serving in the Texas House of Representatives for the 80th Legislative Session, Creighton was appointed to serve as Vice Chair of General Investigating and Ethics, Vice Chair of Local Government Ways and Means, Natural Resources and State Water Funding.

Creighton ran unopposed in 2008, and won re-election with 49,263 votes.

In 2009, during the 81st Texas Legislative Session, Creighton was appointed to serve as a Member of the Appropriations Committee, the Calendars Committee, General Investigating and Ethics and Natural Resources.

Creighton again did not draw a challenger in the 2010 election, and was re-elected for a 3rd term to the Texas House of Representatives.

In 2011, Creighton served as Chair of the Committee on State Sovereignty, Vice Chair of General Investigating and Ethics, and appointed to serve on Natural Resources and the Pensions, Investments and Financial Services Committee. He was also appointed to the Medicaid Reform Waiver Legislative Oversight Committee and Texas Response to Sequestration Interim Committee.

On January 11, 2019, Creighton filed Senate Bill 345 with the 86th Legislature and entitled it the Jones Forest Preservation Act ("Jones Forest Act"). The Jones Forest Act protects the 1,722 acre William Goodrich Jones State Forest from development.  In 2018, Texas A&M University suggested that the university would develop a Texas A&M campus on the land, which sits next to The Woodlands, Texas. Neighborhood associations in the area complained that the development would add to traffic congestion and eliminate a forest that has been part of Texas heritage since 1923.

In January 2023, during the 88th Texas Legislative Session, Creighton was appointed to serve as Chairman of the Education Committee of the Senate and as Chair of the Higher Education Subcommittee.  He was also appointed as a member of various committees, which included Business & Commerce, Finance, Jurisprudence, and the special committee on Redistricting.

2014 elections
On October 3, 2013, State Senator Tommy Williams said he would not run again in the State Senate Republican primary election scheduled for March 4, 2014.

In May 10, 2014, special election to fill the Senate seat that Williams left, Creighton came in first place with 45 percent of the vote.   Creighton received 45.2 percent, Toth 23.7 percent, Bunch 21.8 percent, and Galloway 9.3 percent.  Creighton and Toth faced other in a runoff election on August 5, 2014.

Creighton won the August 5, 2014, special election runoff for the District 4 seat in the Texas Senate, 67 to 33 percent, over fellow former state representative Republican Steve Toth of The Woodlands.

Rice University political science professor Mark Jones said both Creighton and Toth "are significantly more conservative than Williams."

Views

Abortion
In 2017, he sponsored, in the State Senate, House Bill 214, which limited insurance coverage for abortion procedures in Texas. This law bans private and public health insurance plans from offering coverage for abortion except through the purchase of an optional rider, which insurance companies, HMOs, and employers are not required to provide and which must be purchased prior to pregnancy.

Confederate monuments

In 2017, Creighton introduced legislation, SB 112, which would forbid local governments from moving or changing memorials that have stood on public lands for more than forty years. Monuments older than 20 years and less than 40 years old could be moved only with legislative approval, and under the legislation those monuments would need to be placed in "a prominent location."  Monuments less than 20 years old could be moved if approved by the Texas legislature, the Texas Historical Commission, or the State Preservation Board.

The measure would prevent San Antonio officials from removing the obelisk statue of an unnamed Confederate soldier in the downtown Travis Park. City council member William "Cruz" Shaw, who supports removing the monument, said that cities should have "symbolism that is representative of our diverse community."

LGBTQ rights
In 2019, Creighton sponsored SB 15, which weakens anti-discrimination laws passed by Texas cities. Creighton said it stood for "Texas values." The Human Rights Campaign labelled it "a wholly unacceptable bill", saying "Texans don't have an appetite for discrimination."

Election results
2022 general election for Texas Senate, 4th district

2020 general election for Texas Senate, 4th district

2016 general election for Texas Senate, 4th district

2014 Special Election

2006 general election for Texas Representative, 16th district

References

External links
 Official webpage on Texas Senate
 CreightonForTX on Twitter
 CreightonForTX on Facebook
 

1970 births
Living people
Republican Party Texas state senators
Republican Party members of the Texas House of Representatives
People from Conroe, Texas
University of Texas at Austin alumni
Oklahoma City University School of Law alumni
Texas lawyers
Oklahoma lawyers
Ranchers from Texas
Businesspeople from Texas
Baptists from Texas
21st-century American politicians